A sauna, or sudatory, is a small room or building designed as a place to experience dry or wet heat sessions, or an establishment with one or more of these facilities. The steam and high heat make the bathers perspire. A thermometer in a sauna is typically used to measure temperature; a hygrometer can be used to measure levels of humidity or steam. Infrared therapy is often referred to as a type of sauna, but according to the Finnish sauna organisations, infrared is not a sauna.

History

The oldest known saunas in Finland were made from pits dug in a slope in the ground and primarily used as dwellings in winter. The sauna featured a fireplace where stones were heated to a high temperature. Water was thrown on the hot stones to produce steam and to give a sensation of increased heat. This would raise the apparent temperature so high that people could take off their clothes. The first Finnish saunas were always of a type now called savusauna; "smoke sauna". These differed from present-day saunas in that they were operated by heating a pile of rocks called a kiuas by burning large amounts of wood for about 6 to 8 hours and then letting out the smoke before enjoying the löyly, a Finnish term meaning, collectively, both the steam and the heat of a sauna. A properly heated "savusauna" yields heat for up to 12 hours.

As a result of the Industrial Revolution, the sauna evolved to use a wood-burning metal stove with rocks on top, kiuas, with a chimney. Air temperatures averaged around  but sometimes exceeded  in a traditional Finnish sauna. As the Finns migrated to other areas of the globe, they brought their sauna designs and traditions with them. This led to a further evolution of the sauna, including the electric sauna stove, which was introduced in 1938 by Metos Ltd in Vaasa. Although sauna culture is more or less related to Finnish and Estonian culture, the evolution of the sauna took place around the same time in Finland and other Baltic countries; all have valued the sauna, its customs and traditions until the present day.

The sauna became very popular especially in Scandinavia and the German-speaking regions of Europe after the Second World War. German soldiers had experienced Finnish saunas during their fight against the Soviet Union on the Soviet-Finnish front of WWII, where they fought on the same side. Saunas were so important to Finnish soldiers that they built saunas not only in mobile tents but even in bunkers. After the war, the German soldiers brought the custom back to Germany and Austria, where it became popular in the second half of the 20th century. The German sauna culture also became popular in neighbouring countries such as Switzerland, Belgium, the Netherlands and Luxembourg.
Archaeological sites in Greenland and Newfoundland have uncovered structures very similar to traditional Scandinavian farm saunas, some with bathing platforms and "enormous quantities of badly scorched stones".

Areas such as the rocky Orkney islands of Scotland have many ancient stone structures for normal habitation, some of which incorporate areas for fire and bathing. It is possible some of these structures also incorporated the use of steam in a way similar to the sauna, but this is a matter of speculation. The sites are from the Neolithic age, dating to approximately 4000 B.C.E.

The traditional Korean sauna, called the hanjeungmak, is a domed structure constructed of stone that was first mentioned in the Sejong Sillok of the Annals of the Joseon Dynasty in the 15th century. Supported by Sejong the Great, the hanjeungmak was touted for its health benefits and used to treat illnesses. In the early 15th century, Buddhist monks maintained hanjeungmak clinics, called hanjeungso, to treat sick poor people; these clinics maintained separate facilities for men and women due to high demand. Korean sauna culture and kiln saunas are still popular today, and Korean saunas are ubiquitous.

Etymology
The word sauna is an ancient Finnish word referring to both the traditional Finnish bath and to the bathhouse itself. In Finnic languages other than Finnish and Estonian, sauna and cognates do not necessarily mean a building or space built for bathing. It can also mean a small cabin or cottage, such as a cabin for a fisherman.

Modern saunas

The sauna known in the western world today originates from Northern Europe. In Finland, there are built-in saunas in almost every house, including communal saunas in the older apartment buildings; since the 80s, private saunas have often been built into the bathrooms of typical Finnish flats in apartment buildings, sometimes even in student housing. There are also a number of public saunas in Finland, including Rajaportin Sauna, a sauna located in Tampere, that was first established in 1906 by Hermanni and Maria Lahtinen. Helsinki even has a sauna built into one of the gondolas of a ferris wheel, SkyWheel Helsinki. Unlike many other countries, Finnish people usually prefer to be naked instead of wearing a swimsuit, towel, or other kind of clothing.

Under many circumstances, temperatures approaching and exceeding  would be completely intolerable and possibly fatal to a person exposed to them for long periods of time. Saunas overcome this problem by controlling the humidity. The hottest Finnish saunas have relatively low humidity levels in which steam is generated by pouring water on the hot stones. This allows air temperatures that could evaporate water to be tolerated and even enjoyed for longer periods of time. The "wet heat" would cause scalding if the temperature were set much higher.

In a typical Finnish sauna, the temperature of the air, the room and the benches are above the dew point even when water is thrown on the hot stones and vaporised. Thus, they remain dry. This process releases heat and makes the steam feel hot.

Finer control over the perceived temperature can be achieved by choosing a higher-level bench for those wishing for a hotter experience, or a lower-level bench for a more moderate temperature. A good sauna has a relatively small temperature gradient between the various seating levels. Doors need to be kept closed and used quickly to maintain the temperature and to keep the steam inside.

Some North American, Western European, Japanese, Russian, and South African public sport centres and gyms include sauna facilities. They may also be present at public and private swimming pools. As an additional facility, a sauna may have one or more jacuzzis. In some spa centers, there are the so-called special "snow rooms," also known as cold saunas or cryotherapy.

According to the Guinness Book of World Records, the world's largest sauna is the Koi Sauna in the Thermen & Badewelt Sinsheim, Germany. It measures 166 square meters, holds 150 people and sports a koi aquarium. The title may now belong to Cape East Spa in Haparanda, Sweden, which also holds 150 people but is more spacious.
However, in Czeladz, south Poland, there is now a sauna for 300 people, sporting light shows, theatre and needing several sauna masters.

Use

A modern sauna with an electric stove usually takes about 15–30 minutes to heat up. Some users prefer taking a shower beforehand to speed up perspiration in the sauna. When in the sauna, people often sit on a towel for hygiene and put a towel over their heads if the face feels too hot but the body feels comfortable. In Russia, a felt "banya hat" may be worn to shield the head from the heat; this allows the wearer to increase the heat on the rest of the body. The temperature of one's bath can be controlled via:
 the amount of water thrown on the stove: this increases humidity, so that sauna bathers perspire more copiously
 the length of one's stay in the sauna
 positioning: the higher benches are hotter, whereas the lower benches are cooler. Children often sit on the lower benches.

The heat will be greatest closest to the stove. Heating from the air will be lower on the lower benches as the hot air rises. The heat given by the steam can be very different in different parts of the sauna. As the steam rises directly upwards, it will spread across the roof and travel out towards the corners, where it will then be forced downwards. Consequently, the heat of fresh steam may sometimes be felt most strongly in the furthest corners of the sauna. Users increase the duration and the heat gradually over time as they adapt to the sauna. When pouring water onto the stove, it will cool down the rocks, but carry more heat into the air via advection, making the sauna warmer.

Perspiration is the result of autonomic responses trying to cool the body. Users are advised to leave the sauna if the heat becomes unbearable, or if they feel faint or ill. Some saunas have a thermostat to adjust the temperature, but the owner of the sauna and the other bathers expect to be consulted before changes are made. The sauna stove and rocks are very hot—one must stay well clear of them to avoid burns, particularly when water is thrown on the rocks, which creates an immediate blast of steam. Combustibles on, or near the stove have been known to cause fires. Contact lenses dry out in the heat. Jewelry or anything metallic, including glasses, will get hot in the sauna and can cause discomfort or burning.

The temperature on different parts of the body can be adjusted by shielding one's body with a towel. Shielding the face with a towel has been found to reduce the perception of heat.
 Some may wish to put an additional towel or a special cap over the head to avoid dryness. Few people can sit directly in front of the stove without feeling too hot from the radiant heat, but this may not be reflected in their overall body temperature. As the person's body is often the coolest object in a sauna room, steam will condense into water on the skin; this can be confused with perspiration.

Cooling down by immersing oneself in water (in a shower, lake or pool) is a part of the sauna cycle and is as important as the heating. However, it is advisable that healthy people and heart patients alike should take some precautions if plunging into very cold water straight after coming from the hot room, as the rapid cooling of the body produces considerable circulatory stress. It is considered good practice to take a few moments after exiting a sauna before entering a cold plunge, and to enter a plunge pool or a lake by stepping into it gradually, rather than immediately immersing oneself fully. In summer, a session is often started with a cool shower.

In some countries the closest and most convenient access to a sauna is at a gymnasium. Some public pools, major sports centres and resorts also contain a sauna. Therapeutic sauna sessions are often carried out in conjunction with physiotherapy or hydrotherapy; these are gentle exercises that do not exacerbate symptoms.

Health effects

There has been widespread research into the health benefits and risks that come from sauna usage; most studies have focused on the Finnish sauna specifically. Sauna bathing leads to mild heat stress, which activates heat shock proteins responsible for repairing misfolded proteins, promoting longevity as well as protection against muscle atrophy and chronic illness.

There is significant evidence that lifelong exposure to sauna (once a week or more) reduces the risk of sudden cardiac death; and that risk reduction is correlated with duration and frequency of use; this reduction is more pronounced when sauna bathing is combined with exercise, compared with either of these practices alone. Tentative evidence supports that the heat stress from saunas can reduce blood pressure and arterial stiffness, and therefore also decrease the risk of cardiovascular disease. These benefits are more pronounced in persons with low cardiovascular function. Evidence exists for the benefit of sauna on people with heart failure. Frequent sauna usage (4-7 times per week) is associated with a decreased risk of neurovascular diseases, including Alzheimer's disease and stroke. Individuals suffering from musculoskeletal disorders could have symptomatic improvement from sauna, and it could be beneficial for glaucoma. It can also relieve the symptoms of respiratory illness and reduce its risk. Weight loss in obese people and improvement of appetite loss present with normal body weight is achieveable with sauna bathing.

Evidence for the use of sauna for depression or skin disorders is insufficient, but the frequency of sauna sessions is correlated with a diminished risk of developing psychosis, and it might be beneficial for psoriasis.

Sauna bathing coupled with alcohol consumption or dehydration increases the risk of sudden death; the use of narcotic drugs, such as cocaine, also increases the risk. Being severely obese, having high blood pressure, or being diabetic all serve as reasons to decrease the duration of sauna sessions. Individuals prone to postural hypotension or severe valvular heart disease should use sauna cautiously to reduce the risk of a drop in blood pressure. In people with cardiovascular disease, sauna usage is generally safe, as long as their condition is stable. However, sauna bathing is contraindicated in persons with unstable angina and severe aortic stenosis. A one-year study in Finland showed that only 67 (2.6%) of sudden deaths in saunas were non-accidental, mostly due to coronary heart disease. Pregnant women can use saunas as long as their core temperature does not exceed , as this may be teratogenic. Genital heat stress from frequent sauna sessions could cause male infertility.

Technologies
Today there are a wide variety of sauna options. Heat sources include wood, electricity, gas and other more unconventional methods such as solar power. There are wet saunas, dry saunas, infrared saunas, smoke saunas, and steam saunas. There are two main types of stoves: continuous heating and heat storage type. Continuously heating stoves have a small heat capacity and can be heated up on a fast on-demand basis, whereas a heat storage stove has a large heat (stone) capacity and can take much longer to heat.

Heat storage-type

Smoke sauna
Smoke sauna (Finnish savusauna, Estonian suitsusaun, Võro savvusann) is one of the earliest forms of the sauna. It is simply a room containing a pile of rocks, but without a chimney. A fire is lit directly under the rocks and after a while the fire is extinguished. The heat retained in the rocks, and the earlier fire, becomes the main source for heating the sauna. Following this process, the ashes and embers are removed from the hearth, the benches and floor are cleaned, and the room is allowed to air out and freshen for a period of time. The smoke deposits a layer of soot on every surface, so if the benches and back-rests can be removed while the fire is alight the amount of cleaning necessary is reduced. The tradition almost died out in Finland, but was revived by enthusiasts in the 1980s. These are still used in present-day Finland by some enthusiasts, but usually only on special occasions such as Christmas, New Year's, Easter, and juhannus (Midsummer). Smoke saunas are popular in the southern Estonia and smoke sauna tradition in Võrumaa was added into UNESCO Intangible Cultural Heritage Lists in 2014.

Heat storage-sauna
The smoke-sauna stove is also used with a sealed stone compartment and chimney (a heat storage-stove) which eliminates the smoke odour and eye irritation of the smoke sauna. A heat storage stove does not give up much heat in the sauna before bathing since the stone compartment has an insulated lid. When the sauna bath is started and the löyly shutter opened a soft warmth flow into the otherwise relatively cold sauna. This heat is soft and clean because, thanks to combustion, the stove stones glow red, even white-hot, and are freed of dust at the same time. When bathing the heat-storage sauna will become as hot as a continuous fire-type sauna but more humid. The stones are usually durable heatproof and heat-retaining peridotite. The upper part of the stove is often insulated with rock wool and firebricks. Heat-storing stoves are also found with electric heating, with similar service but no need to maintain a fire.

Continuous heat-type

Continuous fire sauna
A continuous fire stove, instead of stored heat, is a relatively recent invention. There is a firebox and a smokestack, and stones are placed in a compartment directly above the firebox. It takes a shorter time to heat than the heat-storage sauna, about one hour. A fire-heated sauna requires manual labor in the form of maintaining the fire during bathing; the fire can also be seen as a hazard.

Fire-heated saunas are common in cottages, where the extra work of maintaining the fire is not a problem.

Electric stove sauna 
The most common modern sauna types are those with electric stoves. The stones are heated up and kept on temperature using electric heating elements. There is a thermostat and a timer (typically with eight hours' maximum delay time, followed by one hour's continuous heating time) on the stove. This type of heating is generally used only in urban saunas.

Other sweat bathing facilities

Many cultures have sweat baths, though some have more spiritual uses while others are purely secular. In Ancient Rome there was the thermae or balneae (from Greek βαλανεῖον balaneîon), traits of which survive in the Turkish or Arab hammam. In the Americas there is the Nahuatl (Aztec) temāzcalli , Maya zumpul-ché, and the Mixtec Ñihi; in Canada and the United States, a number of First Nations and Native American cultures have various kinds of spiritual sweat lodges (Lakota: inipi, Anishinaabemowin madoodiswan). In Europe we find the Estonian saun (almost identical to the Finnish sauna), Russian banya, Latvian pirts, the European Jews' shvitz, and the Swedish bastu. In Asia the Japanese Mushi-Buro and the Korean jjimjilbang. The Karo people of Indonesia have the oukup. In some parts of Africa there is the sifutu.

Around the world

Although cultures in all corners of the world have imported and adapted the sauna, many of the traditional customs have not survived the journey. Today, public perception of saunas, sauna "etiquette" and sauna customs vary hugely from country to country. In many countries sauna going is a recent fashion and attitudes towards saunas are changing, while in others traditions have survived over generations.

Africa
In Africa, the majority of sauna facilities are found in a more upmarket hotel, spa and health club environments and predominantly share both sauna heater technology and design concepts as applied in Europe. Even though outdoor temperatures remain warmer and more humid, this does not affect the general application or intended sauna experience offered within these commercial environments offering a traditional sauna and or steam shower experience.

Asia
In Iran, most gyms, hotels and almost all public swimming pools have indoor saunas. It is very common for swimming pools to have two saunas which are known in Persian as سونای خشک "dry sauna" and سونای بخار "steam sauna", with the dry type customarily boasting a higher temperature. A cold-water pool (and/or more recently a cold Jacuzzi) is almost always accompanied and towels are usually provided. Adding therapeutic or relaxing essential oils to the rocks is common. In Iran, unlike Finland, sitting in a sauna is mostly seen as part of the spa/club culture, rather than a bathing ritual. It is most usually perceived as a means for relaxation or detoxification (through perspiration). Having a sauna room on private property is considered a luxury rather than a necessity. Public saunas are segregated and nudity is prohibited.

In Japan, many saunas exist at sports centers and public bathhouses (sentō). The saunas are almost always gender separated, often required by law, and nudity is a required part of proper sauna etiquette. While right after World War II, public bathhouses were commonplace in Japan, the number of customers have dwindled as more people were able to afford houses and apartments equipped with their own private baths as the nation became wealthier. As a result, many sentōs have added more features such as saunas in order to survive.

In Korea, saunas are essentially public bathhouses. Various names are used to describe them, such as the smaller mogyoktang, outdoor oncheon, and the elaborate jjimjilbang. The word "sauna" is used a lot for its 'English appeal'; however, it does not strictly refer to the original Fennoscandian steam rooms that have become popular throughout the world. The konglish word sauna (사우나) usually refers to bathhouses with Jacuzzis, hot tubs, showers, steam rooms, and related facilities.

In Laos, herbal steam sauna or hom yaa in Lao, is very popular especially with women and is available in every village. Many women apply yogurt or a paste blend based on tamarind on their skin as a beauty treatment. The sauna is always heated by wood fire and herbs are added either directly to the boiling water or steam jet in the room. The sitting lounge is mix gender but the steam rooms are gender separated. Bael fruit tea known in lao as muktam tea is usually served.

Australia and Canada
In Australia and Canada, saunas are found mainly in hotels, swimming pools, and health clubs and if used by both men and women, nudity is often forbidden, even if implicitly. In gyms or health clubs with separate male and female change rooms, nudity is permitted; however, members are usually asked to shower before using the sauna and to sit on a towel.

In Canada, saunas have increasingly become a fixture of cottage culture, which shares many similarities with its Finnish counterpart (mökki).

Europe

Dutch-speaking regions

Public saunas can be found throughout the Netherlands and Flanders, both in major cities and in smaller municipalities, mixed-gender nudity is the generally accepted rule. Some saunas might offer women-only (or "bathing suit only") times for people who are less comfortable with mixed-gender nudity; Algemeen Dagblad reported in 2008 that women-only, bathing suit-required times are drawing Muslim women in the Netherlands to the sauna.

Finnish and Estonian sauna

This induces relaxation and promotes sweating. People use a bundle of birch twigs with fresh leaves (Finnish: vihta or vasta; Estonian: viht), to slap the skin and create further stimulation of the pores and cells.

The sauna is an important part of daily life, and families bathe together in the home sauna. There are at least 2 million saunas in Finland according to official registers. The Finnish Sauna Society believes the number can actually be as high as 3.2 million saunas (population 5.5 million). Many Finns take at least one a week, and much more when they visit their summer cottage in the countryside. Here the pattern of life tends to revolve around the sauna, and a nearby lake used for cooling off.

Sauna traditions in Estonia are almost identical to Finland as saunas have traditionally held a central role in the life of an individual. Ancient Estonians believed saunas were inhabited by spirits. In folk tradition sauna was not only the place where one washed but also used as the place where brides were ceremoniously washed, where women gave birth and the place the dying made their final bed. The folk tradition related to the Estonian sauna is mostly identical to that surrounding the Finnish sauna. On New Year's Eve, a sauna would be held before midnight to cleanse the body and spirit for the upcoming year.

The United Kingdom, Atlantic and Mediterranean Europe

In the United Kingdom and much of Southern Europe, single-gender saunas are the most common type. Nudity is expected in the segregated saunas but usually forbidden in the mixed saunas. This is a source of confusion when residents of these nations visit the Netherlands, Belgium, Germany and Austria or vice versa. Sauna sessions tend to be shorter, and cold showers are shunned by most. In the United Kingdom, where public saunas are becoming increasingly fashionable, the practice of alternating between the sauna and the jacuzzi in short seatings (considered a faux pas in Northern Europe) has emerged. Foreign visitors should also be aware that some small establishments advertised as "saunas" are in fact brothels, and it is rare to have a legitimate sauna with no other health spa or gym facilities in the UK.

In Portugal, the steam baths were commonly used by the Castrejos people, prior to the arrival of the Romans in the western part of the Iberian Peninsula. The historian Strabo spoke of Lusitans traditions that consisted of having steam bath sessions followed by cold water baths. Pedra Formosa is the original name given to the central piece of the steam bath in pre-Roman times.

German-speaking countries

In Germany, Austria, Luxembourg and South Tyrol (but rarely in the remainder of Italy), most public swimming pool complexes have sauna areas; in these locales, nudity is the generally accepted rule, and benches are expected to be covered by people's towels. These rules are strictly enforced in some public saunas. Separate single-sex saunas for both genders are rare, most places offer women-only and mixed-gender saunas, or organise women-only days for the sauna once a week. Loud conversation is not usual as the sauna is seen as a place of healing rather than socialising. Contrary to Russia and Nordic countries, pouring water on hot stones to increase humidity (Aufguss, lit: "Onpouring") is not normally done by the sauna visitors themselves; larger sauna areas have a person in charge (the Saunameister) for that, either an employee of the sauna complex or a volunteer. Aufguss sessions can take up to 10 minutes, and take place according to a schedule. During an Aufguss session, the Saunameister uses a large towel to circulate the hot air through the sauna, intensifying sweating and the perception of heat. Once the Aufguss session has started it is not considered good manners to enter the sauna, as opening the door would cause loss of heat (Sauna guests are expected to enter the sauna just in time before the Aufguss. Leaving the session is allowed, but grudgingly tolerated). Aufguss sessions are usually announced by a schedule on the sauna door. An Aufguss session in progress might be indicated by a light or sign hung above the sauna entrance. Cold showers or baths shortly after a sauna, as well as exposure to fresh air in a special balcony, garden or open-air room (Frischluftraum) are considered a must.

In German-speaking Switzerland, customs are generally the same as in Germany and Austria, although you tend to see more families (parents with their children) and young people. Also in respect to socialising in the sauna the Swiss tend more to be like the Finns, Scandinavians or Russians. Also in German-speaking countries, there are many facilities for washing after using the sauna, with 'dunking pools' (pools of very cold water in which a person dips themselves after using the sauna) or showers. In some saunas and steam rooms, scented salts are given out which can be rubbed into the skin for extra aroma and cleaning effects.

Hungary

Hungarians see the sauna as part of wider spa culture. Mixed genders use the sauna together and wear swimsuits. Single-sex saunas are rare, as well as those which tolerate nudity. Some Hungarian saunas have so-called "snow rooms" that look like little cages with snow and icicles, where visitors can cool down for a couple of minutes after each sauna session.

Czech Republic and Slovakia
In the Czech Republic and Slovakia, saunas have a long tradition and are often found as part of recreational facilities, as well as public swimming pools. Many people are regular goers, while many never go. Saunas became more popular after about the year 2000, when large aquaparks and wellness centers began to include them. Nudity is increasingly tolerated, and many places prohibit the use of swimsuits; however, most people cover themselves with a towel. Showers are typically semi-private. Having men and women only days was the norm in the past, but today, men-only facilities are rare, while women-only hours are sometimes provided.

Norway and Sweden
In Norway and Sweden saunas are found in many places, and are known as 'badstu' or 'bastu' (from 'badstuga' "bath cabin, bath house"). In Norway and Sweden, saunas are common in almost every public swimming pool and gym. The public saunas are generally single-sex and may or may not permit use of swimwear. Rules for swimwear and towels for sitting on or covering yourself differ between saunas. Removing body hair in the sauna, staring at other's nudity or spreading odors is considered impolite.

Russia, Latvia, Lithuania and Eastern Europe

In Latvia, Lithuania and many regions of Russia sauna-going plays a central social role. These countries also have the tradition of massaging fellow sauna-goers with leafy, wet birch bunches: slota in Latvian, vanta in Lithuanian, venik (веник) in Russian. In Latvian, sauna is pirts, in Lithuanian, it is pirtis.

In Russian-speaking communities the word banya (Russian: Баня) is widely used also when referring to a public bath. In Russia, public banya baths are strictly single-sex, while in Finland, Estonia, Lithuania and Latvia, both types occur. During wintertime, sauna-goers often run outdoors for either ice swimming or, in the absence of lake, just to roll around in the snow naked and then go back inside.  Russian traditional banya is quite similar to Finnish sauna, despite the popular misconception that the Finnish sauna is very dry.

In modern Russia, there are three different types of saunas. The first one, previously very popular especially during the 20th century, is the public sauna or the banya, (also known as the Russian banya), as it is referred to among the locals, is similar in context to public bathhouses in Russia, Ukraine and Belarus. The banya is a large setting with many different rooms. There is at least one sauna (Finnish style), one cold pool of water, a relaxation area, another sauna where fellow-sauna goers beat other fellow-sauna goers with the leafy birch, a shower area, a small cafeteria with a TV and drinks, and a large common area that leads to the other areas. In this large area, there are marble bed-like structures where people lie down and receive a massage either by another sauna-member or by a designated masseur. In the resting area, there are also other bed-like structures made of marble or stone attached to the ground where people lie down to rest between different rounds of sauna or at the very end of their banya session. There is also a large public locker area where one keeps one's clothes as well as two other more private locker areas with individual doors that can lock these two separate locker rooms.

The second type of sauna is the Finnish sauna type one can find in any gym throughout the world or a hotel. It could be in the locker room or mixed (i. e. male and female together). Attitudes towards nudity are very liberal and people are less self-conscious about their nude bodies.

The third type of sauna is one that is rented by a group of friends. It is similar to the public banya bath house type, except that it is usually more modern and luxurious, and is often rented by groups of friends by the hour for the use of partying and socialising. Here it can be single-sex or mixed-sex.

North America and Central America

In the United States, the earliest saunas that arrived with the colonists were Swedish bastus in the colony New Sweden around the Delaware River. The Swedish Governor at the time had a bathhouse on Tinicum Island. Today sauna culture enjoys its greatest popularity in the Lake Superior Region, specifically the Upper Peninsula of Michigan, especially the Keweenaw Peninsula, and parts of Minnesota, Wisconsin, and Iowa, which are home to large populations of Swedish and particularly Finnish Americans. Duluth, Minnesota, at its peak, had as many as 14 public saunas. Indeed, among Finnish farms in Great Lakes "sauna country", the cultural geographer Matti Kaups, found that 90% had sauna structures - more even than the farms in Finland. Elsewhere, sauna facilities are normally provided at health clubs and at hotels, but there is no tradition or ritual to their use. To avoid liability, many saunas operate at only moderate temperatures and do not allow pouring water on the rocks. A wider range of sauna etiquette is usually acceptable in the United States compared to other countries, with the exception that most mixed-sex saunas usually require some clothing such as a bathing suit to be worn. These are uncommon, however, as most saunas are either small private rooms or in the changing rooms of health clubs or gyms. There are few restrictions and their use is casual; bathers may enter and exit the sauna as they please, be it nude, with a towel, dripping wet in swimsuits or even in workout clothes (the latter being very unusual). Like many aspects of US culture, there are few prescribed conventions and the bather should remain astute to "read" the specific family or community's expectations. Besides the Finnish Americans, the older generation of Korean-Americans still uses the saunas as it is available to them. Sauna societies are beginning to emerge in colleges across America, with the first one being formed at Gustavus Adolphus College.

A cultural legacy of Eastern European Jews in America is the culture of 'shvitz', which used to be widespread in the East Coast and occasionally in the Pacific West Coast.

The sweat lodge, used by a number of Native American and First Nations traditional ceremonial cultures, is a location for a spiritual ceremony. The focus is on the ceremony, and the sweating is only secondary. Unlike sauna traditions, and most forcefully in the case of the Inipi, the sweat lodge ceremonies have been robustly defended as an exclusively Native expression of spirituality rather than a recreational activity.

Traditions and old beliefs

A Finnish word löyly  is strictly connected to the sauna. It can be translated as "sauna steam" and refers to the steam vapour created by splashing water on the heated rocks. In many languages related to Finnish, there is a word corresponding to löyly. The same approximate meaning is used across the Finnic languages such as in Estonian leil. Originally this word meant "spirit" or "life", as in e. g. Hungarian lélek and Khanty lil, which both mean "soul", referring to the sauna's old, spiritual essence. The same dual meaning of both "spirit" and "(sauna) steam" is also preserved in the Latvian word gars. There is an old Finnish saying, "saunassa ollaan kuin kirkossa",—one should behave in the sauna as in church.

Saunatonttu, literally translated as "sauna elf", is a little gnome or tutelary spirit that was believed to live in the sauna. He was always treated with respect, otherwise, he might cause much trouble for people. It was customary to warm up the sauna just for the tonttu every now and then, or to leave some food outside for him. It is said that he warned the people if a fire was threatening the sauna or punished people who behaved improperly in it—for example, slept, or played games, argued, were generally noisy or behaved otherwise immorally there. Such creatures are believed to exist in different cultures. The Russian banya has an entirely corresponding character called a bannik.

In Thailand, women spend hours in a makeshift sauna tent during a month following childbirth. The steam is typically infused with several herbs. It is believed that the sauna helps the new mother's body return to its normal condition more quickly.

Recognition

Sauna culture has been registered in the Representative List of the Intangible Cultural Heritage of Humanity under two entries: "Smoke sauna tradition in Võromaa" in 2014  and "Sauna culture in Finland" in 2020.

Engineering and simulation
The physical phenomena occurring inside a sauna (heat, fluid dynamics, convection, radiation, etc.) can be modeled in order to study and optimize the design (thermal comfort for instance, avoidance of the 'pain zone' in the sense of the 'Stoll curve', etc.)

Journal
An international scientific journal about the sauna is currently planned, the International Journal of Sauna Studies, focused on three main themes: health, history and culture, technology and design.

See also

Notes

References

Sauna
Finnish culture
Finnish inventions
Finnish words and phrases
Rooms
Traditional medicine
Bathing